The Portland Chamber Orchestra is an orchestra based in Portland, Oregon. Founded in 1947 by Boris Sirpo, its first performance was on May 27, 1947 at the Neighbors of Woodcraft Auditorium. Its home venue is Lewis & Clark College.

First concert 
Boris Sirpo, the founding music director, was an energetic and demanding conductor. The first concert performed in 1947 was a tour de force of performance which included Gluck's Overture to Orfeo ed Euridice, Corelli's Concerto Grosso, John Humphries's Concerto for Strings, Carl Stamitz's Orchestra Quartet, Paul Hindemith's Three Pieces for Strings, Jean Sibelius's Romance in C,  A. Arensky's Variations on a Theme by Tschaikowsky, and Bach's Concerto in A Minor based on a Theme by Vivaldi.

Music directors/conductors 

1947-1967 Boris Sirpo
1967-1970 John Trudeau
1970-1992 Paul Bellam
1992 Sylvan Fremaux guest conductor
1992 Charles Schneider guest conductor
1993 Anthony Armore guest conductor
1993-1996 Charles Schneider
1996-2002 Anthony Armore
2002–present Yaacov Bergman

External links 
Portland Chamber Orchestra (official website)

Musical groups from Portland, Oregon
Musical groups established in 1947
1947 establishments in Oregon
Orchestras based in Oregon